Anders Castus Svarstad (22 May 1869 – 22 August 1943) was a Norwegian painter, most frequently associated with his urban landscapes.

Career
Anders Castus Svarstad was born at Lille Svarstad in Hole, in Ringerike. He was a pupil at the Norwegian National Academy of Craft and Art Industry in Kristiania (now Oslo) from 1886 to 1889 and worked for a time as decorative paints, including time spent in Chicago at the World's Columbian Exposition (1892–94). He studied in Paris and the following year with Laurits Tuxen in Copenhagen (1897-1898). At the end of the 1890s, he was a student at the Académie Colarossi in Paris.

He made the debut of his paintings at the Autumn Exhibition in Kristiania in 1902. After the debut, he competed regularly at art exhibitions, but supported himself and his family still also through decorative painting. Until around 1907, he worked both as an artist and decorative painter. Svarstad made several trips abroad. During these travels, it was scenes from the big cities that fascinated him most. Features of the modern era in the form of telephone wires, gas tanks or factory chimneys all made their entry in his art.

Together with fellow artist Søren Onsager he ran an art school from 1926 to 1929. He was also an art critic and sat on the Council of the National Gallery of Norway and Artist House and as director of Oslo Art Society. He is represented in the National Gallery of Norway and the Bergen Kunstmuseum with portraits, city scapes and still lifes.

Personal life
He was married twice. In 1904, he married Ragna Moe (1882-1963). The marriage was dissolved in 1912. He was married to Nobel Prize winning Norwegian novelist Sigrid Undset from 1912 until the marriage was dissolved in 1927.

Gallery

Selected works
 Fra Akerselven, 1908–12, Drammens Museum
Palonetto Santa Lucia, 1909, Bergen Art Museum
 Parti fra La Morgue, 1910, National Gallery of Norway
 Sigrid Undset, 1911, Bergen Art Museum
 Fabrikker ved Themsen, 1912, Bergen Art Museum
 Sigrid Undset, 1912, Den norske forfatterforening, Oslo
 Terrasse i Roma, 1913, National Gallery of Norway
 Via Bocca di Leone, 1908, Bergen Kunstmuseum

References

1869 births
1943 deaths
19th-century Norwegian painters
20th-century Norwegian painters
Norwegian male painters
People from Hole, Norway
Norwegian expatriates in France
Académie Colarossi alumni
19th-century Norwegian male artists
20th-century Norwegian male artists